The Vought F6U Pirate was the Vought company's first jet fighter, designed for the United States Navy during the mid-1940s. Although pioneering the use of turbojet power as the first naval fighter with an afterburner and composite material construction, the aircraft proved to be underpowered and was judged unsuitable for combat. None were ever issued to operational squadrons and they were relegated to development, training, and test roles before they were withdrawn from service in 1950.

Design and development

A specification was issued by the Navy's Bureau of Aeronautics (BuAer) for a single-seat, carrier-based fighter powered by a Westinghouse 24C (later J34) axial turbojet on 5 September 1944. Chance Vought was awarded a contract for three V-340 (company designation) prototypes on 29 December 1944.

The XF6U was a small aircraft with tricycle undercarriage and with straight wings and tail surfaces. The wings were short enough that they did not need to fold. To fit more aircraft into crowded hangars, the nose gear could be retracted and the aircraft's weight would rest on a small wheel attached by the ground crew. This raised the tail up so that it could overlap the nose of the aircraft behind it, allowing more aircraft to fit into available hangar space. The turbojet engine was mounted in the rear fuselage and was fed by ducts in each wing root.

The most unusual feature of the aircraft was its use of "Metalite" for its skin. This was made of balsa, sandwiched between two thin sheets of aluminum. "Fabrilite" was also used for the surfaces of the vertical stabilizer and rudder; this was similar to Metalite but used fiberglass instead of aluminum. Two fuel tanks were fitted in the center of the fuselage; the forward tank, ahead of the wing, contained  and the rear tank, . These were supplemented by two jettisonable  tip tanks. The cockpit was well forward and was provided with a bubble canopy which gave the pilot good visibility. He was provided with a Mk 6 lead-computing gyro gunsight. Underneath the cockpit were four 20 mm (0.79 in) M3 autocannon. Their 600 rounds of ammunition were carried behind the pilot. The empty casings of the two upper guns were retained in the aircraft, while those from the two lower guns were ejected overboard.

After a company-wide contest to name the aircraft, the initial prototype received the name Pirate and made its first flight on 2 October 1946. Flight testing revealed severe aerodynamic problems, mostly caused by the airfoil section and thickness of the wing. The vertical stabilizer also had to be redesigned to smooth out the airflow at the intersection of the horizontal and vertical stabilizers. Other changes included the addition of dive brakes on the sides of the fuselage and the replacement of the Metalite panels near the engine exhaust with stainless steel ones.

The first XF6U-1 prototype was powered by a Westinghouse J34-WE-22 turbojet with 3,000 lbf (13.34 kN) thrust, one third of the weight of the aircraft.

Operational history
In 1947, before the flight testing of the prototypes was completed, 30 production aircraft were ordered. They incorporated an ejection seat and a redesigned vertical stabilizer as well as two auxiliary fins, one towards the tip on each side of the tailplane in an attempt to improve the directional stability of the aircraft. The fuselage was lengthened to fit additional equipment and the wing had fillets added at the rear junction with the fuselage.

During the production run, the Navy decided to move the Chance Vought factory from Stratford, Connecticut, to a much larger facility in Dallas, Texas, which had been vacant since the end of World War II; this badly disrupted the production of the Pirate. The airframes were built in Stratford and trucked to Dallas, where government-furnished equipment, such as the engines and afterburners, were installed. The completed aircraft were then taxied around the new plant's airfield, but the runway was deemed too short to handle jets. The aircraft had to be disassembled and trucked to an abandoned airfield at Ardmore, Oklahoma, with a runway long enough for acceptance testing.
 
The first production F6U-1 performed its initial flight on 29 June 1949, and 20 of the aircraft were provided to VX-3, an operational evaluation squadron based at Naval Air Station Patuxent River in Maryland. The judgment from the evaluation was that the Pirate was unacceptable for operational use. Naval aviators disparagingly called the F6U the "groundhog". On 30 October 1950, BuAer informed Vought of the Navy's opinion of the Pirate in terms both bureaucratic and scathing: "The F6U-1 had proven so sub-marginal in performance that combat utilization is not feasible."

The aircraft ended up being used primarily to develop arresting gear and barriers, but were used operationally for a short time by at least one Texas-based United States Naval Reserve squadron as they transferred to jets. The 30 production aircraft had only a total of 945 hours of flight time, 31.5 hours each. Some aircraft flew only six hours which was enough for little more than their acceptance flight and the flight to their disposition. The downfall of the aircraft was that it was underpowered and was at times considered "sub-marginal", not an unusual problem with jets of the era.

Variants
XF6U-1: Three prototypes, two with a Westinghouse J34-WE-22 turbojet engine (BuNo 33532, 33533), one with a J34-WE-30 with afterburner (BuNo 33534).
F6U-1: Afterburner-equipped production version, 30 built (BuNo 122478-122507), 35 cancelled.
F6U-1P: Conversion of one F6U-1 (BuNo 122483) for photo-reconnaissance.

Operators

United States Navy
VX-3

Survivors
Although the F6U had a very short operational career, one example remains intact (122479, Vought production number 2) and has undergone restoration by the Vought Aircraft Heritage Foundation, at the Vought plant in Grand Prairie, Texas. , the aircraft is currently at the National Naval Aviation Museum in Pensacola Florida.

Specifications (F6U-1)

See also

References

Bibliography
 Green, William and Gordon Swanborough. The Complete Book of Fighters. New York: Barnes & Noble, 1988. .
 Koehnen, Richard. Chance Vought F6U Pirate (Naval Fighters Number Nine). Simi Valley, California: Ginter Books, 1983. .
 Swanborough, Gordon and Peter M. Bowers. United States Navy Aircraft since 1911. London: Putnam Aeronautical Books, Third edition, 1990. .

Further reading

F6U
Vought F6U
Single-engined jet aircraft
Low-wing aircraft
Carrier-based aircraft
Aircraft first flown in 1946